The 1915 Presbyterian Blue Hose football team represented Presbyterian College as an independent during the 1915 college football season. Led by the first-year head coach Walter A. Johnson, Presbyterian compiled a record of 4–4. The team captain was J. W. C. Bell.

Schedule

References

Presbyterian
Presbyterian Blue Hose football seasons
Presbyterian Blue Hose football